KQCR-FM (98.9 FM) is a 6,000-watt radio station licensed by the FCC for operation in Parkersburg, Iowa, with its broadcast originating from Hampton, Iowa and its tower located between Aplington, Iowa and Ackley, Iowa. KQCR serves Franklin and Butler Counties and as well as portions of Hardin, Wright, Cerro Gordo, Floyd, Hamilton, Hancock and Grundy Counties.

The station first began broadcasting in November 2000, playing mostly adult contemporary music.  KQCR also features live coverage of high school sporting activities and local events such as the Butler County Fair.

External links
KQCR official website

QCR
Mainstream adult contemporary radio stations in the United States